The 2021–22 season was the 113th season in the existence of SK Sturm Graz and the club's 56th consecutive season in the top flight of Austrian football. In addition to the domestic league, Sturm Graz participated in this season's edition of the Austrian Cup and the UEFA Europa League.

Players

First-team squad

Out on loan

Transfers

In

Out

Pre-season and friendlies

Competitions

Overall record

Austrian Football Bundesliga

Regular stage

Results summary

Results by round

Matches
The league fixtures were announced on 22 June 2021.

Championship round

Austrian Cup

UEFA Europa League

Play-off round
The draw for the play-off round was held on 2 August 2021.

Group stage

The draw for the group stage was held on 27 August 2021.

References

SK Sturm Graz seasons
Sturm Graz
2021–22 UEFA Europa League participants seasons